Francesca Dolcini (born 28 December 1974) is a former Italian female pole vaulter who won six national championships at individual senior level from 1995 to 2004.

Biography
In the early 90s Francesca Dolcini was a pioneer of the specialty of the pole vault that was born at the female level in those years throughout the world. Her best result on the international senior level was the 9th place in the pole vault final at the 1998 European Athletics Indoor Championships held in Valencia.

She several times broke the national record of pole vault.

Achievements

National titles
Italian Athletics Championships
Pole vault: 2002 (1)
Italian Athletics Indoor Championships
Pole vault: 1998, 1999, 2000, 2001, 2002 (5)

References

External links
 

1974 births
Living people
Italian female pole vaulters
Athletes from Rome